Tel Keppe (alternatively spelled Tel Kaif or Telkef) is an Assyrian town in northern Iraq. It is located in the Nineveh Governorate, less than 8 mi (13 km) northeast of Mosul.

Etymology 
The name Tel Keppe (Syriac: ܬܸܠ ܟܹܐܦܹܐ) is of Assyrian Aramaic origin and derives from the words tel meaning “hill”, and keppe meaning “stones”. Therefore, the town’s name translates to “hill of stones”.

History 

The first reliable reference to the town is written in the book ”The History of Mosul”, by Abu Zakaria Azidi. The book was released in 945 AD and he wrote about the history of Mosul, in which he referenced the town of Tel Keppe. Zakaria also mentioned a different author from the year 749 AD, who also mentions the village Tel Keppe as one of the Mosul’s many suburbs.

In 1508, Tel Keppe was sacked by Mongols. In 1743, Tel Keppe was looted and burned by the armies of the Persian leader Nader Shah. This event took place within the context of the Siege of Mosul, in which the Persian army suffered heavy casualties and resorted to looting the surrounding towns to have some semblance of victory. In 1833, the town was once again sacked, this time by the Kurdish Governor of Rawandiz who also sacked the town of Alqosh.

Occupation by ISIL 
On 6 August 2014, the town was taken over by the Islamic State (ISIS), along with the nearby Assyrian towns of Bakhdida, Bartella and Karamlesh. Upon entering the town, ISIS looted the homes and removed the crosses and other religious objects from the churches. The Christian cemetery in the town was also later destroyed.

Soon after the beginning of the Battle of Mosul, Iraqi troops advanced on Tel Keppe, but the fighting continued into 2017. Iraqi forces recaptured the town from ISIL on the 19th of January 2017.

In 2017, Salman Esso Habba of the "Christian Mobilization" militia - a part of the Popular Mobilization Forces - warned the Arabs to leave, claiming that Tel Keppe’s homes belonged only to Christians in the town, MEMO reported Wednesday. He also said that Christians’ homes and rights could not be taken away.

5 years after the liberation of Tel Keppe and most of the indigenous Assyrian population is yet to return, mostly due to the presence of the non-local Babylon Brigades militia. The majority of the towns inhabitants either fled to large cities, or fled Iraq as a whole. Very few Assyrians returned or had any plans to return.

Arabization
Tel Keppe has faced Arabization since the late 70’s under the rule of Saddam Hussein. Arabs began moving to Tel Keppe, while Assyrians began moving to the larger cities in Iraq, mainly Baghdad, Basra and Mosul. The Northern Iraq Offensive by ISIS made things even worse for the Assyrians. After Tel Keppe was liberated, most Assyrians fled to Baghdad and the Kurdistan Region or fled Iraq entirely, causing more Arabs to settle in the town. The contested security and presence of Arab-dominated militias in the Nineveh Plains has prevented the return of thousands of Tel Keppe residents. Tel Keppe has a majority Arab Muslim population as of 2021.

Climate 
Tel Keppe has a semi-arid climate (BSh) with extremely hot summers and cool, damp winters, typical to the Nineveh Plains.

Demographics 

In 1768, the town had a recorded population of 2,500. Due to plague and other disasters, the population was around 1,500 in 1882, rising to 2,500 again by 1891. In 1923, the population was recorded as 14,000. In 1933, the population numbered around 10,000. As a result of emigration from the town to Baghdad and the United States, the population shrunk to 7,108 by 1968.

The district of Tel Keppe was approximately 50% Christian in the mid 1900s, the town of Tel Keppe remaining almost exclusively Christian with a population of 6,600 inhabitants. Throughout the late 20th century, the town experienced non-native population growth from the arrival of Arabs, who established residence throughout the town and became the majority after ISIS. By the turn of the century, the population had swelled to close to 30,000.

Some families who settled in Tel Keppe are:

 Asmar and Abso from Diyarbakır
 Karmo and Mengeshnayeh from Saart
 Dinha/Joja, Shalal, and Abro from Ashitha (Tyari)
 Ma’arouf and Qoryaqos from Tal Afar
 Zooma, Khoshe, and Hnawa from Mardin
 Jolagh from Alqosh
 Nasfo from Aleppo
 Saba and Kharkhar from Iran
 Twaini from Amadiya
 Orou from Sanna, Iran
 Jammo, Kassab, and Manni from Bashbetha
 Jibaya and Kthawe from Turkey
 Talya from Lebanon
 Qasha Giwargis from Quchanis, Turkey
 Qarbo from Jazirat Ibn Omar
 Bizzi from al-Karaj
 Qashat from Sinjar

Tel-Kepnayeh today 
Starting in the 1980s, and especially after the 1991 Gulf War and 2003 US Invasion of Iraq, many Chaldean Catholics from Tel Keppe fled to other countries, primarily the United States. They set up their lives there with new churches and business for their families. By 2001, many Tel-Kepnayeh had moved to major cities in Iraq such as Baghdad or Mosul.

Assyrian diaspora in United States 
Many Chaldean Catholic Assyrians in the Metro Detroit area trace their origins to Tel Keppe. According to the estimates of a priest of Tel Keppe's Sacred Heart Chaldean Rite Catholic Church, there were 10,000 worshippers in the late 1950s, which later decreased to 2,000 around 2004. He said: "Many people don’t want to go from here; they cry that they have to go… but you almost have to leave these days because your family probably already is in Detroit."

Culture 

Tel Keppe was historically the center of the Chaldean Catholic community in Iraq. Each family residing in Tel Keppe had one or more plots of farming land located outside Tel Keppe. The land produced barley and wheat, and animals raised there included goats and sheep. Natalie Jill Smith, author of "Ethnicity, Reciprocity, Reputation and Punishment: An Ethnoexperimental Study of Cooperation among the Chaldeans and Hmong of Detroit (Michigan)", wrote that in the reports of the village "everyone was related" and that marriage tended to occur between two people from the same village.

Notable Tel-Kepnayeh

Deceased 

 Maria Theresa Asmar, author and explorer, born in 1806. Published her memoir "Babylonian Princess" in English in 1844
 Tariq Aziz, born Mikhail Yuhanna (1936–2015 ) Foreign Minister and Deputy Prime Minister and a close advisor of President Saddam Hussein. He studied English at Baghdad University and later worked as a journalist, before joining the Ba'ath Party in 1957
 Emmanuel III Delly: Patriarch of the Chaldean Catholic Church (1927–2014)
 Yusuf Malek, one of the leaders of the Assyrian movement in Iraq during the 1930s. Author of "The British Betrayal of the Assyrians"
 Joseph II Marouf: Patriarch of the Chaldean Catholic Church (1667–1713)

Living 

 José Murat Casab: Former governor of Oaxaca, Mexico; President of the Mexican Senate; and President of the Chamber of Deputies
 Mar Ramzi Garmou: Archbishop of Tehran – Iran for the Chaldean Catholic Church
 Alejandro Murat Hinojosa: Son of José Murat Casab and current governor of the State of Oaxaca
 Mar Ibrahim Namo Ibrahim: Bishop Emeritus of the Chaldean Catholic Church for the Eastern United States
 Mar Sarhad Yawsip Jammo: Bishop Emeritus of the Chaldean Catholic Church for Western United States.

 Mar Francis Y. Kalabat: Bishop of the Chaldean Catholic Church for the Eastern United States.
 FaZe Rug: Famous Youtuber, Part of the FaZe clan

See also 

 Assyrian homeland
 Assyrians in Iraq
 Nineveh Plains
 Proposals for Assyrian autonomy in Iraq
 List of Assyrian settlements
 Batnaya and Barwari – Assyrian tribes also in Northern Iraq
 Iraqi conflict (2003–present)

References 

Assyrian communities in Iraq
Populated places in Nineveh Governorate
District capitals of Iraq
Nineveh Plains